Pvris (pronounced "Paris" and stylized PVRIS) is an American pop rock act formed by multi-instrumentalist, singer, songwriter, and producer Lyndsey Gunnulfsen. Over her decade-long career, Gunnulfsen has released three studio LPs: White Noise in November 2014 featuring the hits "You and I", and "My House", All We Know of Heaven, All We Need of Hell in 2017 featuring "What's Wrong", and Use Me in 2020 featuring "Hallucinations".

History

Formation and early releases (2009–2014)
The band was formed in Lowell, Massachusetts, in 2009 under the name Operation Guillotine. They were originally a metalcore band, consisting of five members, with Kyle Anthony performing lead vocals. Their line-up soon changed to vocalist/guitarist Lynn Gunn (born Lyndsey Gunnulfsen), guitarist Alex Babinski, bassist Brian Macdonald, and drummer Brad Griffin. On March 26, 2013, Pvris released their self-titled EP. The sound was described as post-hardcore. They played sporadic shows through the Spring, including a mini-tour with Love, Robot.

During the summer of 2013, the band played a week on Ernie Ball's Battle of the Bands stage at Warped Tour after winning a contest. On July 18, it was announced that they had signed with Tragic Hero Records, though it was short-lived. It was also during this time, on July 26, that the band officially changed their name from 'Paris' to 'Pvris', citing legal reasons. The band went on The Rise Up Tour supporting A Skylit Drive in September and October. Shortly after the end of the tour, they parted ways with their drummer Brad Griffin, and continued as a trio. Pvris began teasing fans that they would soon be hitting the studio to write and record new material around this time. That recording process began in December when Pvris entered the studio with Blake Harnage of Versa. On February 7, 2014, they officially announced that they were a part of an Acoustic 4 Way Split with A Loss For Words, Wind in Sails and After Tonight which was set to release on April 1, 2014. Coinciding with the release of their Acoustic EP, Pvris joined A Loss For Words, Veara, City Lights, and Moms on the fifth anniversary of The Kids Can't Lose Tour from March 29, 2014, to April 13, 2014.

White Noise (2014–2016)

When the band went into the studio their sound changed drastically, incorporating pop and electronic elements into their music. Gunn claimed this incorporation was done subconsciously. In June 2014 it was announced the band had signed to Rise and Velocity. A music video was released for "St. Patrick" on June 24, and the song was also released as a single on the same day. The track peaked at number 4 on the Kerrang! Rock Chart, spending over fifteen weeks in the top 20. In an interview with The Huffington Post Gunn elaborated on the excitement that came with being able to release new music to the public. "We've been waiting over six months to release anything... It feels incredible to finally unleash it to the world. So many more people are into it than we even imagined!" The band played two weeks on the Battle of the Bands stage at Warped Tour. During their time spent on Warped Tour The Huffington Post released a second article listing them as one of "18 Artists You Need To Know Halfway Through 2014". "Lynn Gunn is a force that cannot be denied, redolently poignant in both her most excitable and serene vocalizations. The first female-led signing of Rise Records, a label that has almost implausibly made metalcore music equally accessible and desirable, the label may have just made its smartest acquisition yet."

The band supported Mayday Parade in October and November on their The Honeymoon Tour. In early September, the band supported Emarosa on the Up Close and Personal tour. Pvris also joined the Ice Grills 2014 Tour in Japan from September 16, 2014, to September 21, 2014. The tour featured Lyndsey and Brian playing with A Loss For Words, State Champs, as well as Pvris providing acoustic support. On September 22, 2014, Pvris announced their debut album "White Noise" due for release on November 4, 2014. The following day, Pvris released a music video for "My House". On October 6, 2014, Pvris released "The Empty Room Sessions" of My House. On October 16, 2014, Pvris released the self-titled track "White Noise" off of their upcoming debut album. On November 10, 2014, it was announced that Pvris would be supporting Pierce the Veil and Sleeping with Sirens on the second leg of their World Tour, and Mallory Knox will also be supporting them. The tour runs from January 23 to March 4, starting in San Diego and ending in Oklahoma City. On March 25, 2015, Pvris released the official video for 'White Noise'.

On June 11, 2015, Pvris won the Relentless Kerrang! Awards 2015 for Best International Newcomer. On June 22, 2015, Pvris released their cover of "Chandelier" by Sia off Punk Goes Pop 6s deluxe edition. On July 2, 2015, Pvris released the official music video for "Holy". On July 21, 2015, Pvris released the official music video for "Fire". The following day, at the Alternative Press Music Awards, they took home the award for Breakthrough Band. The band supported Bring Me the Horizon in the U.S. in October, then supported them the following month in the UK. In February and March, the band supported Fall Out Boy on their tour of the U.S. On January 5, 2016, Pvris made their network television debut by performing "My House" and "White Noise" on Jimmy Kimmel Live!.

On February 17, 2016, the band premiered a new song, titled "You and I" on Radio 104.5. The song was released on February 22, along with a music video, and is featured on a deluxe edition of White Noise, released April 22. The deluxe album also included a stripped version of "You and I", as well as a new track "Empty".

On May 11, 2016, Pvris set out on their first American headlining tour, which wrapped up on June 10. It was announced that the band will be playing at Chicago's Lollapolooza for the first time on July 29, 2016.

All We Know of Heaven, All We Need of Hell (2016–2018)

On July 27, 2016, Lynn Gunn posted a photo on her Twitter showing 45 songs that had been written for album 2. Pvris played their last show of 2016 at Summer Sonic Osaka on August 21. After this they went to the city of Utica in upstate New York to record their second album in a supposedly haunted church turned record studio. On February 13, 2017, Pvris confirmed on a post on their Facebook page that album 2 was done being recorded. On February 17, 2017, Pvris updated all of their social media platforms with a new theme as well as a post with the Roman numerals "II XX XVII" or 2 20 17. On February 20 they announced a small European tour. Lynn Gunn then proceeded to tweet out, "Oh my loves, can't you see? The new era has just begun." She also confirmed that fans would get to hear some new songs on the European tour.

On April 30, 2017, Pvris premiered their new single "Heaven" from their upcoming album on BBC's Radio 1 Rock Show. On May 1, All We Know of Heaven, All We Need of Hell was announced for release on August 4. On May 4 and 5, 2017, Pvris performed in London as a part of their European tour and previewed the song "Half" for the first time as a part of their new album. On June 13, Pvris premiered their latest single "What's Wrong" on Annie Mac's BBC Radio 1 show as another addition to the AWKOHAWNOH album.

Pvris released a remix of The Aces' single "Last One" on April 26, 2019.

 Hallucinations, Warner/Reprise Records, Use Me, and Babinski's departure (2019–2021) 

The band signed to Reprise/Warner Records after being with Rise, and on July 12, 2019, they released a new single "Death of Me", and an accompanying music video, as their lead single from their EP, Hallucinations. The track debuted at number 1 on the Kerrang Rock Chart.

On August 16, 2019 the band released the song/video "Hallucinations" as their second single, which saw the band continue their progression towards a more dance/EDM influenced sound. In the week leading up to the release of the single, the band sent exclusive vinyl copies of the single to their fans. Frontwoman Lynn Gunn later stated on Twitter that those vinyls were a limited edition of only 500 copies. The track saw commercial and critical success, charting for several weeks on Billboard's Alternative Airplay charts, peaking at No. 35.

On October 19, 2019, they announced on social media that a five-track EP, Hallucinations, would be released on October 25, 2019. On January 8, 2020 it was announced that they would join Halsey on her Manic World Tour, which ended up being postponed indefinitely due to COVID-19.

On March 4, 2020, through some teasing links via their social media channels, they announced their third album, Use Me. On March 4, 2020 the band released "Dead Weight" as the first single from Use Me, and announced a May 1 release date for the album. "Dead Weight" premiered on Annie Mac's BBC Radio 1 show as the "Hottest Record in the World". K. Flay collaborated on the single, which was described as dark pop. The music video for "Dead Weight" was filmed in Milan, Italy. On April 8, 2020, the band announced that the release of Use Me had been delayed to July 10, 2020, and on July 2 the band announced a further delay to August 28, 2020. A deluxe edition of the album was released on October 22, 2020.

On August 26, 2020, the band announced that guitarist Alex Babinski was no longer in the band due to sexual misconduct allegations. Babinski released a statement shortly after, strongly denying the allegations while stating he would take legal action, but stated that he understood the decision made by Gunn and MacDonald.

"Monster" (2021)
In late July, Pvris began teasing their forthcoming single with a cryptic website sweatblvvdtears.com, containing ten Roman numerals that incrementally revealed symbols and clues pertaining to the song and its release. On July 28, the single artwork was revealed at the Pere Lachaise cemetery in Paris, France, ahead of the single's official release on July 30. The music video, directed by Katharine White in Los Angeles, premiered on August 5 via YouTube.

"Animal/Anywhere But Here" (2022)
On October 10, 2022, Pvris began teasing their next two singles on Twitter. Each day leading up to the songs' release on October 20, 2022, the band has posted a link to pre-save the singles on different music platforms.
The new tracks were accompanied by a short film directed by Jax Anderson and Lynn Gunn, which premiered on Youtube. 

Musical style
AllMusic biographer wrote in 2015 that the group "blend[s] dreamy electronica with dark, beat-heavy rock". Rob Sayce of Rock Sound described their sound as a combined mixture of "dark electro-pop and stadium-sized rock". Metro described them as an alternative rock act that fused "electro-pop backdrops with rhythm-driven dark rock music". Their debut EP has been described as post-hardcore. White Noise has been described as electropop, pop, post-hardcore, psychedelic, and synth-pop. Their 2019 EP Hallucinations has been described as EDM, alternative rock, alt-pop, pop rock, electronic rock, and synth-pop.

Band membersCurrent Lynn Gunn – lead vocals, guitar, drums, piano, synthesizers, programming (2012–present)
 Brian MacDonald – bass, keyboards (2012–present)Former Kyle Anthony – unclean vocals (2012)
 Brad Griffin – drums, backing vocals (2012–13)
 Alex Babinski – guitar, keyboards (2012–2020)Touring musiciansDenny Agosto – drums (2020–present)
Justin Nace – drums (2014–2020)TimelineDiscography
Studio albums

Extended plays

Singles

Promotional singles

 Other charted songs 

Other songs

Music videos

Awards and nominationsRock Sound'' AwardsAlternative Press Music AwardsBoston Music AwardsAltRock AwardsKerrang! AwardsReferences
 CitationsSources'''

External links
 

Rise Records artists
Hopeless Records artists
Musical groups from Massachusetts
Musical groups established in 2012
People from Lowell, Massachusetts
American post-hardcore musical groups
American alternative rock groups
American pop rock music groups
Rock music groups from Massachusetts
Tragic Hero Records artists
2012 establishments in Massachusetts
Female-fronted musical groups